Kvam is a village in Nord-Fron Municipality in Innlandet county, Norway. The European route E6 highway and the Dovrebanen railway line both run through the village. The railroad stops at the Kvam Station.

History

During the military campaign in Norway in 1940, Kvam was the scene of a battle between German and British forces. During the battle, the original Kvam Church that was built in 1776 was destroyed by the Germans. In 1952, after the war, the current Kvam Church was constructed on the same site. Kvam has a British military cemetery.

The village experienced devastating floods in 2011 and 2013.

References

Nord-Fron
Villages in Innlandet
Populated places on the Gudbrandsdalslågen